Katarin Koniovskala is a Soviet sprint canoer who competed in the early  1990s. She won a bronze medal in the K-2 5000 m event at the 1990 ICF Canoe Sprint World Championships in Poznań.

References

Living people
Soviet female canoeists
Year of birth missing (living people)
ICF Canoe Sprint World Championships medalists in kayak